This is a list of notable individuals born in Cyprus of Lebanese ancestry or people of Lebanese and Cypriot dual nationality who live or lived in Cyprus.

Athletes
 Marcos Baghdatis - Cypriot professional tennis player (Lebanese father)
 Marios Georgiou (gymnast) - Cypriot professional gymnast

Musicians
 Sarbel - Lebanese-British-Cypriot singer (Lebanese mother)

See also
List of Lebanese people
List of Lebanese people (Diaspora)

References

Cyprus
Lebanese

Lebanese